Boethius (c. 477 – 524 AD) was a Roman philosopher of the early 6th century.

Boethius, Boëthius, or Boetius may also refer to:

People
Buíte of Monasterboice (died c. 519–521), Irish monastic saint, also called Boetius
Boethius (consul 522) (fl. 522–526), son of the Roman philosopher, consul in 522
Boetius of Dacia (fl. 13th century), Danish philosopher
Axel Boëthius (1889–1969), Swedish archaeologist
Hector Boece (or Boethius, or Boyce) (1465–1536), Scottish philosopher and historian
Manlius Boethius (died c. 487), Roman and Italian aristocrat
Maria-Pia Boëthius (born 1947), Swedish author
Boëthius family, a Swedish clerical family

Other uses
Boethius (lunar crater), located on the east edge of Mare Undarum near the eastern lunar limb
Boethius (Mercurian crater), located on Mercury

See also
 Boethusians, a sect or community in Judea during the Hellenistic period
 Boethus (disambiguation)
 Boethos (disambiguation)